Bulwer is a small town in the KwaZulu-Natal's Midlands region, South Africa. It is situated on the R617 regional road between the towns of Boston and Underberg and around 50 minutes north-west of the town of Ixopo on the R56. The village is nestled in the shadow of the Amahwaqa (the misty one) mountain.

Background
The town is named after Natal Governor Sir Henry Bulwer, having been founded during his tenure. Bulwer is a prominent tourist destination for various reasons. It's a popular birding spot, a beautiful place to just relax, but mainly it's a flying destination for both hang gliders and paragliders. Both local and international pilots flock to Bulwer for flying around the year.

The Old Yellowwood Church 
The old yellowwood church (Chapel of the Holy Trinity) in Bulwer was built from hand sawn yellowwood in 1885. It was renovated by Mondi in 1989.

See also
Marutswa Forest, near Bulwer.

References

Populated places in the Dr Nkosazana Dlamini-Zuma Local Municipality